Srikakulam mandal is one of the 38 mandals in Srikakulam district of the Indian state of Andhra Pradesh. It is under the administration of Srikakulam revenue division and the headquarters are located at Srikakulam. The mandal is bounded Amudalavalasa, Etcherla and Gara mandals. A portion of it lies on the banks of Vamsadhara River and Bay of Bengal.

Administration 
The mandal is administered by a Tahsildar and the present tahsildar is Ch.Sattibabu.

Towns and villages

 census, the mandal has 28 settlements. It includes 2 town, 1 out growth and 25 villages.

The settlements in the mandal are listed below:

 Alikam
 Arasavilli (R) (OG)
 Balaga (CT)
 Balivada
 Batteru
 Byri
 Byrivanipeta
 Gudem
 Ippili
 Kallepalle
 Karajada
 Lankam
 Lingalavalasa
 Mofusbandar
 Naira
 Pathasrikakulam (R) (Part)
 Patrunivalasa(Part)
 Peddapadu
 Ponnam
 Ragolu
 Ragolupeta
 Sanivada
 Silagamsingivalasa
 Singupuram
 Srikakulam (M) †
 Thandemvalasa
 Vakalavalasa
 Voppangi

Note: †-Mandal headquarter, CT–Census town, M–Municipality

See also 
List of mandals in Andhra Pradesh

References 

Mandals in Srikakulam district